The following is a list of massacres that have occurred in the Solomon Islands archipelago prior to the formation of the nation state of Solomon Islands (numbers may be approximate):

Notes 
Footnotes

References
 Roger Keesing and Peter Corris. Lightning Meets the West Wind: The Malaita Massacre. Melbourne: Oxford University Press, 1980.
 Swinden, G. The natives appear restless tonight; HMAS Adelaide and the punitive expedition to Malaita 1927 in Maritime power in the twentieth century: the Australian experience, D. Stevens, ed. Allen and Unwin, 1998, 54–67.

Solomon Islands
Massacres